Richard David Hughes (born 8 September 1975) is an English musician, best known as the drummer of the alternative rock band Keane.

Biography 

Richard David Hughes attended Tonbridge School where he was friends with future Keane members Tim Rice-Oxley and Dominic Scott. At the age of 17, Hughes learned to play the drums, and when Scott and Rice-Oxley formed a small covers band in 1995 he was invited to join as drummer. They later invited future lead singer Tom Chaplin to join the band, although Hughes initially objected, later stating, "The idea of giving someone who's already the loudest person you know a microphone was not something that I was particularly keen on."

Hughes then went to university at University College London where he received a degree in geography. He took a job as a secretary at the BBC in order to support himself and the band while they lived and practiced in a flat on Upper Clapton Road in London. He also had a job as a supply teacher for a short time. It has been said that the song 'Put it Behind You' was written by Rice-Oxley for Hughes after he had broken up with a girlfriend, and that much of the album 'Perfect Symmetry' - in particular the track 'You Don't See Me' - was also written about him and his unrequited love for a music journalist who broke his heart by marrying another man. Hughes is known to be the most humorous member of the band. Since Under the Iron Sea was released he has provided additional backing vocals for the band. He was married, presumably to his long-time girlfriend, in 2010.

He is a human rights activist with Amnesty International. On 3 November 2011 Hughes spoke at the Oxford Union about his work with Amnesty International, and his campaign for justice for Troy Davis.

Personal life 
Hughes collects "Nikon" brand cameras and calls himself "Nikon Guy". He is a great lover of photography and updates the site Keane with "photoblogs" with photographs of the band on tour. He is a fan of the Irish rock band U2, and other bands and groups like The Smiths, The Beatles and Björk. His favorite song from the album Hopes and Fears is "Bend and Break" and "Put It Behind You" from Under the Iron Sea. Hughes is colourblind to green and brown, as said in a video where Richard answers 50 fan questions (can be found on the band's YouTube channel.)

Equipment
Hughes uses Yamaha drums, Zildjian cymbals and Vic Firth drumsticks.  He also used Sabian cymbals in the past.

Drums: Yamaha absolute maple

Cymbals: Zildjian: 
 14" A Custom hi-hats 
 18" A Custom projection crash 
 18" ZBT crash/ride 
 19" K dark crash thin 
 21" K crash/ride 
 21" A sweet ride

Supports and foundations
Keane took the initiative to participate in War Child (foundation to help children in countries at war). Richard is an activist who defends human rights, together with Amnesty International. He is also very involved in the case of Troy Davis, sometimes wearing T-shirts with the message "I am Troy Davis" during his tour in the United States. Richard is also a great animal advocate and has been a vegetarian since age 13.

Discography

with Keane

Studio albums
 Hopes and Fears (2004)
 Under the Iron Sea (2006)
 Perfect Symmetry (2008)
 Strangeland (2012)
 Cause and Effect (2019)

EPs
 Retrospective EP1 (2008)
 Night Train (2010)
 Retrospective EP2 (2010)
Compilations album
 The Best of Keane (2013)

References

1975 births
English rock drummers
English human rights activists
Keane (band) members
Living people
Alumni of University College London
Amnesty International people
People from Gravesend, Kent
People educated at Tonbridge School
Ivor Novello Award winners
People from Battle, East Sussex
Musicians from Kent
21st-century drummers